Xicotencatl II Axayacatl, also known as Xicotencatl the Younger (died 1521), was a prince and warleader, probably with the title of Tlacochcalcatl, of the pre-Columbian state of Tlaxcala at the time of the Spanish conquest of the Aztec Empire.

Biography 
He was the son of the ruler of Tizatlan, one of the four confederate altepeme of the Tlaxcallan state, of which Xicotencatl the Younger was considered to be the de facto ruler because of his father's weakened health. His Nahuatl name, pronounced , is sometimes also spelled Xīcohtēncatl and means "person from Xīcohtēnco," a place name that can be translated "at the edge of the bumblebees."

He is known primarily as the leader of the force that was dispatched from Tlaxcallan to intercept the forces of Hernán Cortés and his Totonac allies as they entered Tlaxcallan territory when going inland from the Veracruz coast.  His actions are described in the letters of Cortés, Bernal Díaz del Castillo's Historia verdadera de la conquista de la Nueva España and in the histories of Tlaxcala, such as the one by Diego Muñoz Camargo.

When fighting the Spaniards he used an ambush strategy; he first engaged the enemy with a small force that feigned a retreat, and then lured the Spaniards back to a better fortified position where the main force waited. The Spaniards retreated when too many of their men were killed or wounded, and they sought a peace treaty with the Tlaxcaltecs. Maxixcatzin, the ruler of Ocotelolco, was in favour of allying with the Spaniards, but Xicotencatl II opposed this idea and continued to fight, nearly wiping out the Spanish force. However, in a crucial moment, the soldiers from Ocotelolco retreated from the battlefield following the orders of Maxixcatzin, and Xicotencatl was forced to accept the proposed peace treaty.

The Spaniards with the Tlaxcaltec forces marched on Tenochtitlan, where they stayed until the Noche Triste, at which time they were forced to flee the city after an Aztec uprising. The remnants of the Spanish forces made it to Tlaxcala where they once again asked for the assistance of the Tlaxcaltec, and where Xicotencatl II once again spoke against helping them. However, Maxixcatzin's faction was again successful, and the Spaniards stayed in his palace while they regrouped and received reinforcements.

When the final stage of the siege of Tenochtitlan was about to be carried out, Xicotencatl marched on the Aztec capital as the leader of a Tlaxcaltec force, attacking from the north and passing by Texcoco. The night before the final march, he was apprehended and accused of treason by Cortés and by the Ocotelolcan warleader Chichimecateuctli, who said that he had tried to flee back to Tlaxcala. He was summarily executed by hanging.

The description of Xicotencatl has been subject to changing attitudes in the understanding of the Spanish Conquest of Mexico. In the early period he was seen mostly as a traitor who tried to halt the arrival of the Spanish "liberation" of the Indians from Aztec dominance. Later he was romantically construed as an indigenous hero who valiantly opposed the onslaught of the Spanish. Recently, ethnohistorian Ross Hassig (2001) has analysed his actions in terms of Tlaxcaltec politics, and he concludes that Xicotencatl was mostly acting to further the political interests of his own polity, that of Tizatlan, over the opposing faction of Ocotelolco. The charge of treason lodged against him and his subsequent execution were, in this view, the logical result of the Ocotelolcans finally achieving the upper hand.

See also
Xicotencatl the Elder

References

Further reading

 
 

15th-century births
1521 deaths
Tlaxcaltec nobility

Nobility of the Americas